Meitnerium is a synthetic chemical element with the symbol Mt and atomic number 109. It is an extremely radioactive synthetic element (an element not found in nature, but can be created in a laboratory). The most stable known isotope, meitnerium-278, has a half-life of 4.5 seconds, although the unconfirmed meitnerium-282 may have a longer half-life of 67 seconds. The GSI Helmholtz Centre for Heavy Ion Research near Darmstadt, Germany, first created this element in 1982. It is named after Lise Meitner.

In the periodic table, meitnerium is a d-block transactinide element. It is a member of the 7th period and is placed in the group 9 elements, although no chemical experiments have yet been carried out to confirm that it behaves as the heavier homologue to iridium in group 9 as the seventh member of the 6d series of transition metals. Meitnerium is calculated to have similar properties to its lighter homologues, cobalt, rhodium, and iridium.

Introduction

History

Discovery
Meitnerium was first synthesized on August 29, 1982, by a German research team led by Peter Armbruster and Gottfried Münzenberg at the Institute for Heavy Ion Research (Gesellschaft für Schwerionenforschung) in Darmstadt. The team bombarded a target of bismuth-209 with accelerated nuclei of iron-58 and detected a single atom of the isotope meitnerium-266:

 +  →  + 

This work was confirmed three years later at the Joint Institute for Nuclear Research at Dubna (then in the Soviet Union).

Naming

Using Mendeleev's nomenclature for unnamed and undiscovered elements, meitnerium should be known as eka-iridium. In 1979, during the Transfermium Wars (but before the synthesis of meitnerium), IUPAC published recommendations according to which the element was to be called unnilennium (with the corresponding symbol of Une), a systematic element name as a placeholder, until the element was discovered (and the discovery then confirmed) and a permanent name was decided on. Although widely used in the chemical community on all levels, from chemistry classrooms to advanced textbooks, the recommendations were mostly ignored among scientists in the field, who either called it "element 109", with the symbol of E109, (109) or even simply 109, or used the proposed name "meitnerium".

The naming of meitnerium was discussed in the element naming controversy regarding the names of elements 104 to 109, but meitnerium was the only proposal and thus was never disputed. The name meitnerium (Mt) was suggested by the GSI team in September 1992 in honor of the Austrian physicist Lise Meitner, a co-discoverer of protactinium (with Otto Hahn), and one of the discoverers of nuclear fission. In 1994 the name was recommended by IUPAC, and was officially adopted in 1997. It is thus the only element named specifically after a non-mythological woman (curium being named for both Pierre and Marie Curie).

Isotopes

Meitnerium has no stable or naturally occurring isotopes. Several radioactive isotopes have been synthesized in the laboratory, either by fusing two atoms or by observing the decay of heavier elements. Eight different isotopes of meitnerium have been reported with mass numbers 266, 268, 270, and 274–278, two of which, meitnerium-268 and meitnerium-270, have unconfirmed metastable states. A ninth isotope with mass number 282 is unconfirmed. Most of these decay predominantly through alpha decay, although some undergo spontaneous fission.

Stability and half-lives

All meitnerium isotopes are extremely unstable and radioactive; in general, heavier isotopes are more stable than the lighter. The most stable known meitnerium isotope, 278Mt, is also the heaviest known; it has a half-life of 4.5 seconds. The unconfirmed 282Mt is even heavier and appears to have a longer half-life of 67 seconds. The isotopes 276Mt and 274Mt have half-lives of 0.62 and 0.64 seconds respectively. The remaining five isotopes have half-lives between 1 and 20 milliseconds.

The isotope 277Mt, created as the final decay product of 293Ts for the first time in 2012, was observed to undergo spontaneous fission with a half-life of 5 milliseconds. Preliminary data analysis considered the possibility of this fission event instead originating from 277Hs, for it also has a half-life of a few milliseconds, and could be populated following undetected electron capture somewhere along the decay chain. This possibility was later deemed very unlikely based on observed decay energies of 281Ds and 281Rg and the short half-life of 277Mt, although there is still some uncertainty of the assignment. Regardless, the rapid fission of 277Mt and 277Hs is strongly suggestive of a region of instability for superheavy nuclei with N = 168–170. The existence of this region, characterized by a decrease in fission barrier height between the deformed shell closure at N = 162 and spherical shell closure at N = 184, is consistent with theoretical models.

Predicted properties
Other than nuclear properties, no properties of meitnerium or its compounds have been measured; this is due to its extremely limited and expensive production and the fact that meitnerium and its parents decay very quickly. Properties of meitnerium metal remain unknown and only predictions are available.

Chemical
Meitnerium is the seventh member of the 6d series of transition metals, and should be much like the platinum group metals. Calculations on its ionization potentials and atomic and ionic radii are similar to that of its lighter homologue iridium, thus implying that meitnerium's basic properties will resemble those of the other group 9 elements, cobalt, rhodium, and iridium.

Prediction of the probable chemical properties of meitnerium has not received much attention recently. Meitnerium is expected to be a noble metal. The standard electrode potential for the Mt3+/Mt couple is expected to be 0.8 V. Based on the most stable oxidation states of the lighter group 9 elements, the most stable oxidation states of meitnerium are predicted to be the +6, +3, and +1 states, with the +3 state being the most stable in aqueous solutions. In comparison, rhodium and iridium show a maximum oxidation state of +6, while the most stable states are +4 and +3 for iridium and +3 for rhodium. The oxidation state +9, represented only by iridium in [IrO4]+, might be possible for its congener meitnerium in the nonafluoride (MtF9) and the [MtO4]+ cation, although [IrO4]+ is expected to be more stable than these meitnerium compounds. The tetrahalides of meitnerium have also been predicted to have similar stabilities to those of iridium, thus also allowing a stable +4 state. It is further expected that the maximum oxidation states of elements from bohrium (element 107) to darmstadtium (element 110) may be stable in the gas phase but not in aqueous solution.

Physical and atomic
Meitnerium is expected to be a solid under normal conditions and assume a face-centered cubic crystal structure, similarly to its lighter congener iridium. It should be a very heavy metal with a density of around 27–28 g/cm3, which would be among the highest of any of the 118 known elements. Meitnerium is also predicted to be paramagnetic.

Theoreticians have predicted the covalent radius of meitnerium to be 6 to 10 pm larger than that of iridium. The atomic radius of meitnerium is expected to be around 128 pm.

Experimental chemistry
Meitnerium is the first element on the periodic table whose chemistry has not yet been investigated. Unambiguous determination of the chemical characteristics of meitnerium has yet to have been established due to the short half-lives of meitnerium isotopes and a limited number of likely volatile compounds that could be studied on a very small scale. One of the few meitnerium compounds that are likely to be sufficiently volatile is meitnerium hexafluoride, as its lighter homologue iridium hexafluoride is volatile above 60 °C and therefore the analogous compound of meitnerium might also be sufficiently volatile; a volatile octafluoride might also be possible. For chemical studies to be carried out on a transactinide, at least four atoms must be produced, the half-life of the isotope used must be at least 1 second, and the rate of production must be at least one atom per week. Even though the half-life of 278Mt, the most stable confirmed meitnerium isotope, is 4.5 seconds, long enough to perform chemical studies, another obstacle is the need to increase the rate of production of meitnerium isotopes and allow experiments to carry on for weeks or months so that statistically significant results can be obtained. Separation and detection must be carried out continuously to separate out the meitnerium isotopes and have automated systems experiment on the gas-phase and solution chemistry of meitnerium, as the yields for heavier elements are predicted to be smaller than those for lighter elements; some of the separation techniques used for bohrium and hassium could be reused. However, the experimental chemistry of meitnerium has not received as much attention as that of the heavier elements from copernicium to livermorium.

The Lawrence Berkeley National Laboratory attempted to synthesize the isotope 271Mt in 2002–2003 for a possible chemical investigation of meitnerium, because it was expected that it might be more stable than nearby isotopes due to having 162 neutrons, a magic number for deformed nuclei; its half-life was predicted to be a few seconds, long enough for a chemical investigation. However, no atoms of 271Mt were detected; this isotope of meitnerium is currently unknown.

An experiment determining the chemical properties of a transactinide would need to compare a compound of that transactinide with analogous compounds of some of its lighter homologues: for example, in the chemical characterization of hassium, hassium tetroxide (HsO4) was compared with the analogous osmium compound, osmium tetroxide (OsO4). In a preliminary step towards determining the chemical properties of meitnerium, the GSI attempted sublimation of the rhodium compounds rhodium(III) oxide (Rh2O3) and rhodium(III) chloride (RhCl3). However, macroscopic amounts of the oxide would not sublimate until 1000 °C and the chloride would not until 780 °C, and then only in the presence of carbon aerosol particles: these temperatures are far too high for such procedures to be used on meitnerium, as most of the current methods used for the investigation of the chemistry of superheavy elements do not work above 500 °C.

Following the 2014 successful synthesis of seaborgium hexacarbonyl, Sg(CO)6, studies were conducted with the stable transition metals of groups 7 through 9, suggesting that carbonyl formation could be extended to further probe the chemistries of the early 6d transition metals from rutherfordium to meitnerium inclusive. Nevertheless, the challenges of low half-lives and difficult production reactions make meitnerium difficult to access for radiochemists, though the isotopes 278Mt and 276Mt are long-lived enough for chemical research and may be produced in the decay chains of 294Ts and 288Mc respectively. 276Mt is likely more suitable, since producing tennessine requires a rare and rather short-lived berkelium target. The isotope 270Mt, observed in the decay chain of 278Nh with a half-life of 0.69 seconds, may also be sufficiently long-lived for chemical investigations, though a direct synthesis route leading to this isotope and more precise measurements of its decay properties would be required.

Notes

References

Bibliography

External links

 Meitnerium at The Periodic Table of Videos (University of Nottingham)

 
Chemical elements
Chemical elements with face-centered cubic structure
Synthetic elements
Transition metals